Rock-a-Doodle-Doo is a popular song and hit single by British singer Linda Lewis. 

Written by Lewis and produced by Lewis and her first husband, Jim Cregan, it was her second single, her first hit and her first on the Warner Bros. Records vanity label Raft Records.  The song entered the UK charts at #50 in June 1973 and reached #15 in July finally leaving the chart in August 1973.

References

1973 singles